Elmer D. Wallace (July 5, 1844 – May 21, 1928) was an American politician in the state of North Dakota. He served as Lieutenant Governor of North Dakota from 1893 to 1895 under Governor Eli C. D. Shortridge.

Wallace was born in Macomb County, Michigan in 1844, the son of Robert H. and Sylvia (née Steward) Wallace. He was raised in Detroit, where he moved at the age of 8. Wallace served in the United States Civil War in the Union Army. After the war, he worked as a druggist and in the produce business in Michigan before relocating to Dakota Territory in 1881 to a farm in Edendale Township in Steele County, North Dakota. He served as a delegate to the North Dakota constitutional convention of 1889 and as chairman of the committee on public debts and public works for the state. Wallace served as lieutenant governor as an independent Democrat under Eli C. D. Shortridge from 1893 to 1895. He later moved to Minneapolis in 1906 and died there at his daughter's home on May 21, 1928.

References

1844 births
1928 deaths
People from Macomb County, Michigan
People from Steele County, North Dakota
Politicians from Minneapolis
Politicians from Detroit
Farmers from North Dakota
People of Michigan in the American Civil War
Lieutenant Governors of North Dakota
19th-century American politicians